Lamhuni (also Romanized as Lamhūnī; also known as Lūmhūnī) is a village in Mulan Rural District, in the Central District of Kaleybar County, East Azerbaijan Province, Iran. At the 2006 census, its population was 18, in 6 families.

References 

Populated places in Kaleybar County